Callipolis or Kallipolis was a town of ancient Caria.
 
Its site is located near Gelibolu, Asiatic Turkey.

References

Populated places in ancient Caria
Former populated places in Turkey
History of Muğla Province
Marmaris District